The SIM-VIII (Serbian Cyrillic:СИМ-VIII) was a 1931 Yugoslav, single-engined, 2-seat, sport, tourist and training aircraft, designed by Sima Milutinović and built at the Rogožarski factory in Belgrade from 1931 and by Ikarus at Zemun from  1933.

Design and development
The SIM-VIII was designed by Sima Milutinović at the end of 1930, with a desire to contribute to the development of aviation in Yugoslavia. The prototype  was built at the expense of the constructor and the first test flight was conducted at Zemun in the Autumn of 1931. After certification the aircraft was purchased by the Yugoslav Royal Air Force and the Yugoslav Aeroclub at Belgrade.

The SIM-VIII was a parasol winged monoplane powered by an  Siemens-Halske Sh 14 engine driving a wooden 2-bladed propeller, seating two crew members in tandem open cockpits. Construction of the SIM-VIII employs several new construction solutions designed to reduce cost and streamline production, without compromising aircraft flight characteristics, built mostly of wooden construction with steel fittings at high stress areas. The fuselage is entirely made of wood covered with plywood, and the wings have supporting structure made of wood covered with fabric. On each side, the wings are supported by a pair of inclined struts attached to the lower fuselage longerons, and the fuel tank is also located in the centre fuselage. The control surfaces are made of welded steel tube, covered with fabric and the fixed V-strutted landing gear was built up from high strength steel tube enabling the SIM-VIII to handle rough landing strips.

Operational history
Three SIM-VIIIs were produced by Rogožarski 1931, owned by the Yugoslav Aerocub at Belgrade, (registered YU-PBC, YU-PBD and YU-PCI) which used them for propaganda flights and training sport pilots. The first of the listed aircraft flew until 1937, when it was withdrawn from use and the other two have no recorded history.

The two aircraft built in the Ikarus factory at Zemun in 1933 were not placed on the civil registry and are most likely to have been produced for the Yugoslav Royal Air Force.

Accolades awarded to the SIM-VIII include 1st place at the 1932 International Air Rally (Rundflug), held from 19 July 1932 at Warsaw.

Operators

Royal Yugoslav Air Force - 2 aircraft
Yugoslav Aerocub - 3 aircraft

Specifications

See also

Notes

References

Further reading

External links
 goldenyears - Yugoslovenski registar civilnih aviona
 - Siemens Zeitschrift November 1928

SIM-VIII
1930s Yugoslav military aircraft
Trainer aircraft
High-wing aircraft
Single-engined tractor aircraft
Aircraft first flown in 1931